Horace A. "Jimmy" Jones (November 24, 1906 – September 2, 2001) was an American thoroughbred horse trainer.

The son of Hall of Fame horse trainer Ben A. Jones, Jimmy Jones was born in Parnell, Missouri.  Raised around horses from infancy, he learned how to train them from his father while working with him at Woolford Farm in Prairie Village, Kansas from 1931 to 1939, after which his father signed on as the head trainer at Calumet Farm in Lexington, Kentucky.  There, Jimmy  worked as his father's assistant but his career was interrupted when he joined the United States military during World War II.  After the war ended he returned to training horses, and in 1948 took over as head trainer from his father, who was appointed Calumet Farm's general manager.

In 1948 Jimmy Jones stepped aside as the trainer of record for Citation to allow his father to be officially designated as the trainer for the Kentucky Derby.  Ben Jones wanted the opportunity to equal the record of Herbert J. "Derby Dick" Thompson, who had trained four Derby winners. Citation won the race. Ben Jones later returned to training and won the Derby two more times.  Jimmy Jones was named Citation's trainer for the Preakness Stakes and the Belmont Stakes.  Citation became the Jones family's second U.S. Triple Crown winner. In 1957, Jimmy Jones won his first "official" Kentucky Derby with Iron Liege, and claimed victory again the next year with future Hall of Fame colt Tim Tam, who also won the Preakness. Many fans and race experts believe Tim Tam would have won the Triple Crown had he not broken a sesamoid bone in his right foreleg coming down the home stretch in the Belmont Stakes, where he finished second.

As head trainer for Calumet Farm, Jimmy Jones trained seven champion horses and won 54 stakes races. In addition to his two Derby wins, he won four Preakness Stakes and one Belmont Stakes. He was the leading trainer in the United States five times (1947, 1948, 1949, 1957, 1961) and was the first trainer to earn more than $1 million in purses in a single season. In 1959, he followed his father as an inductee into the National Museum of Racing and Hall of Fame.  He retired from training in 1964 to take over as the Director of Racing at Monmouth Park Racetrack in Oceanport, New Jersey.

Jones spent his final years in full retirement in his native Missouri, where he spent the last few years of his life at St. Francis Hospital and Health Services in Maryville. He bequeathed several million dollars to the hospital, where a new patient wing was erected with several pieces of memorabilia put on display in his memory.

Kentucky Derby Record 

† - While Jimmy Jones was the trainer of Citation, he allowed his father Ben Jones to be listed as the trainer in the Kentucky Derby. He took over Citation's training and won the Preakness and Belmont.

References
Horace A. Jones at the United States' National Museum of Racing and Hall of Fame
Bowen, Edward L. Masters of the Turf: Ten Trainers Who Dominated Horse Racing's Golden Age (2007) Eclipse Press

1906 births
2001 deaths
American horse trainers
American military personnel of World War II
People from Nodaway County, Missouri
United States Thoroughbred Racing Hall of Fame inductees
People from Maryville, Missouri